TVF may refer to:
TVF Communications, UK company
Turkish Volleyball Federation
IATA code for Thief River Falls Regional Airport, Minnesota, USA
ICAO code for Transavia France
Truth-value focus, an abbreviation used in linguistics
The Viral Fever, an Indian video on demand and over-the-top streaming service
Turkey Wealth Fund, Turkish abbreviation